"Cheetah Sisters" is a song from The Cheetah Girls' self-titled soundtrack album The Cheetah Girls. The song has an urban pop sound and was written by Jamie Houston. Another version of the song known as the Barcelona Mix was released on The Cheetah Girls 2 soundtrack, but Raven-Symoné did not record this version, although her vocals from the chorus were sampled.

Music video
The video for the song features the performance of "Cheetah Sisters" in the movie and clips from the movie are intercut throughout the video. It premiered on June 29, 2004 on Disney Channel.

Official versions
 "Cheetah Sisters" - 3:06
 "Cheetah Sisters (Barcelona Mix)" - 2:42

2003 songs
2003 singles
The Cheetah Girls songs
Walt Disney Records singles
Songs written by Jamie Houston (songwriter)